"Tonight I'm Free" is the debut single by English pop duo PJ & Duncan. It was originally performed on the children's drama show Byker Grove before the decision was made to officially release it as a single.  A 1994 remix was included on their debut album Psyche and features cast members from the show.

Track listing
CD single

Charts

References

External links
 Official video
 Tonight I'm Free release

1993 debut singles
1993 songs
Ant & Dec songs
Telstar Records singles